The Great Wall Sailor is a Pickup truck produced by Great Wall Motors.

Overview

As the pickup version of the Great Wall Sing, the body of the Great Wall Sing was the third generation Isuzu Faster produced under license with a redesigned front end heavily resembling a Nissan Paladin/Frontier. The Great Wall Sailor was later replaced by the Great Wall Wingle built on the same platform.

References

External links

Official website

Sailor
Pickup trucks
Trucks of China
2000s cars
Cars of China